Country of the Deaf is a 1998 Russian crime film directed by Valery Todorovsky, loosely based on Renata Litvinova's novel To Own and Belong. The film set in a fictional underworld of deaf-mute people in Moscow. The film was entered into the 48th Berlin International Film Festival.

Plot
The action takes place in Moscow in the 1990s. The heroine of the film – Rita is forced into hiding; Her friend Alyosha has disappeared after losing someone else's money in a game of roulette. She is rescued and hidden by Yaya, a deaf nightclub dancer, who lives only for one thing – to save money and go to some fabulous "country of the deaf," where only deaf people live, virtue and justice reigns. Suddenly, the girls find themselves in the center of a violent clash between two mafia clans – one with and one without hearing impairment.

Cast
 Chulpan Khamatova as Rita
 Dina Korzun as Yaya
 Maksim Sukhanov as Svinya
 Nikita Tyunin as Alyosha (voiced by Sergei Bezrukov)
 Aleksandr Yatsko as The Albino
 Alexey Gorbunov as Landlord
 Pavel Pajmalov as Mao
 Sergey Yushkevich as Nuna
 Alexey Diakov as Molodoy  
 Yaroslav Boyko as bandit

Awards
At the 1998 Russian Guild of Film Critics Awards the film was awarded the prizes for Best Film, Best Music (Alexey Aygi), Best Female Actor (Dina Korzun), Best Supporting Actor (Maksim Sukhanov). At the Nika Award the film received the prizes for Best Female Actor (Dina Korzun) and Best Sound Design (Gleb Kravetsky).

See also
List of films featuring the deaf and hard of hearing

References

External links

1998 films
1998 crime films
1990s Russian-language films
Films directed by Valery Todorovsky
Films set in Moscow
Russian Sign Language films
Films about deaf people
Russian crime films
Films about disability